Solvent Yellow 56 is the organic compound N,N-diethyl-p-(phenylazo)aniline. It is an azo dye, which has the appearance of a reddish yellow powder. Its EINECS number is 219-616-8. Its structure is similar to Solvent Yellow 124, which used as a fuel dye in European Union, and to Aniline Yellow.

Uses
It is used to dye hydrocarbon solvents, oils, fats, waxes (candles), notably petrol, mineral oil and shoe polishes, and polystyrene resins.  In pyrotechnics, it is used in some yellow colored smokes, reflecting its tendency to sublime.

References

Azo dyes
Solvent dyes
Diethylamino compounds